Belgian immigrants moved to Wisconsin during the American Civil War.

Introduction
Northeast Wisconsin saw a huge influx of immigrants from Belgium in the mid-1800s. It began in 1852 when two Belgian families decided to make the move to America. They were unhappy with the Belgian monarchy, and sought what is now known as the "American dream." Belgians then flooded Brown, Door, and Kewaunee counties. They settled in communities named after cities in the Old Country, such as Brussels, Namur, and Rosiere. To this day those three counties still hold a significant number of people with Belgian roots. 

It was not long before the new immigrants were forced into the major issue facing the United States: the American Civil War. War rosters were first filled by volunteers. When newspapers made more reports of casualties, the number of volunteers fell, forcing states like Wisconsin to start a draft. Belgians thought they were safe because they did not consider themselves citizens, but the government stretched definitions to fit most men. In order for immigrants to get land, they had to sign a "Declaration of Intent" which said they intended to become United States citizens at some point. This made them eligible for the draft.

Draft Processes
Each town's assessor was assigned to gather a list of men, age 18-45, healthy enough to fight. Belgian families felt they were unfairly targeted by those in charge of drafts. In Door County, 40 of the 63 men drafted were Belgian. There were options for men to skip the draft, but not many, especially Belgian men, were successful. Doctors were flooded by potential soldiers claiming disabilities, which would allow them to stay home. Among the ailments claimed, there were hernias, lameness, poor sight or hearing, varicose veins and ulcers. In September 1862, Dr. H. Pearce verified disability 246 of the 454 men that sought a way out. Of those, 21 were Belgian. Shortly after, the first Civil War draft in Wisconsin was in November 1862. Finances surely came into play when it came to paying out of the draft as of 1863. Those who were desperate and able would pay $300 to get out of the war. A total of 862 men paid this, with a mere 18 of them being Belgian. The last option was for the draftee to find a substitute. This came into effect in 1864. It was difficult to find someone willing to go to war, but a substitute could have been a full-blooded Native American, a minor, or a non-citizen.

Riots
After it seemed to many Belgian people that the draft was fixed, emotions began to run high. One of the biggest issues was the language barrier. Few Belgian immigrants spoke English, therefore could not understand why they were being drafted into a war they had no intent of being a part of. Anger soon overcame these men. They would form marches with clubs, pitchforks and guns. They wanted to see fair enrollment processes. In one of the most explosive demonstrations, colonists formed and marched into the city of Green Bay, Wisconsin. They stood outside United States Senator Timothy Howe's home and demanded action. Howe addressed the crowd from his home. But because of the language barrier, the immigrants could not understand, Howe felt threatened and fled the city. Not feeling satisfied, the mob continued to march around the town until they found a fellow Belgian, O.J. Brice. Brice was able to calm the crowd in their native French. He explained that the drafting process would be filled with justice and fairness. The group was satisfied with his explanation in their own language. They then disbanded and returned home without damage or arrests.

Notes

Further reading

Belgian-American culture in Wisconsin
Belgian-American history
History of Wisconsin
Brown County, Wisconsin
Door County, Wisconsin
Kewaunee County, Wisconsin